Christina Victoria Bassadone (born 27 December 1981) is a British sailor who competed in the 2008 Summer Olympics.

References

External links 
 
 
 
 

1981 births
Living people
British female sailors (sport)
People educated at The Prebendal School
Olympic sailors of Great Britain
Sailors at the 2004 Summer Olympics – 470
Sailors at the 2008 Summer Olympics – 470